The 1984 Air Canada Cup was Canada's sixth annual national midget 'AAA' hockey championship, which was played April 17 – 21, 1984 at the North Bay Memorial Gardens in North Bay, Ontario.  Prior to the season, the Canadian Amateur Hockey Association overhauled the format of the Air Canada Cup.  Under the new format, the twelve branch champions would compete in five regional playoffs to qualify for the national championship.  They would be joined by the host team to round out the six-team field.

The host North Bay Pinehill ended up winning the first gold medal under the Air Canada Cup's new format.  The Notre Dame Hounds and Lions du Lac St-Louis took silver and bronze, respectively.  Future National Hockey League players competing in the 1984 tournament were Shawn Anderson, Ian Herbers, Claude Lapointe, Don MacLean, Mike O'Neill, Randy McKay, Myles O'Connor, Luke Richardson, Cam Russell, Darren Turcotte, and Brad Werenka.

Teams

Round robin

Standings

Scores

North Bay 5 - Ottawa West 3
Notre Dane 3 - Sherwood Park 0
Lac St-Louis 6 - Dartmouth 1
North Bay 5 - Sherwood Park 1
Notre Dame 4 - Ottawa West 0
Ottawa West 5 - Sherwood Park 5
Notre Dame 7 - Dartmouth 0
Lac St-Louis 1 - Sherwood Park 0
North Bay 9 - Dartmouth 1
Lac St-Louis 6 - Ottawa West 3
North Bay 3 - Notre Dame 1
Sherwood Park 8 - Dartmouth 1
Lac St-Louis 4 - Notre Dame 1
Ottawa West 3 - Dartmouth 3
Lac St-Louis 1 - North Bay 1

Playoffs

Semi-finals
North Bay 5 - Sherwood Park 4 (2OT)
Notre Dame 7 - Lac St-Louis 4

Bronze-medal game
Lac St-Louis 5 - Sherwood Park 4 (2OT)

Gold-medal game
North Bay 5 - Notre Dame 3

Individual awards
Most Valuable Player: Guy Girouard (North Bay)
Top Scorer: Barry Gilberson (Ottawa West)
Top Forward: Steve Rosebrook (Ottawa West)
Top Defenceman: Sean Whitham (Sherwood Park)
Top Goaltender: Bill Horn (Notre Dame)
Most Sportsmanlike Player: Ron Pitre (Dartmouth)

See also
Telus Cup

References

External links
Telus Cup Website
Hockey Canada-Telus Cup Guide and Record Book

Telus Cup
Air Canada Cup
Sport in North Bay, Ontario
April 1984 sports events in Canada